A Reason to Live may refer to:

 A Reason to Live (1985 film), an American drama film
 A Reason to Live (2009 film), a documentary film about teen and young adult depression and suicide
 A Reason to Live (2011 film), a South Korean film
 A Reason to Live (album), a 1993 album by Cindy Morgan
 Reason to Live, a 2002 album by Sixty Watt Shaman
 "Reason to Live", a 1987 song by Kiss
 "Reason to Live", a 2001 song by Gotthard from the album Homerun

See also
 Reasons to Live (disambiguation)